Positive Songs for Negative People is the sixth studio album by English singer/songwriter Frank Turner. It was released on 7 August 2015 by Xtra Mile Recordings. The album garnered a positive reception but critics said it was derivative of Turner's previous works. Positive Songs for Negative People debuted at number 2 in the UK and number 69 on the Billboard 200 and spawned only one single: "The Next Storm". To promote the record, Turner toured across North America, Europe and Australia.

Promotion
On 15 June 2015, Turner announced a few UK tour dates on November to promote the upcoming album, beginning with Llandudno's Venue Cymru arena and finishing at London's Alexandra Palace. On 19 August, he added some in-store performances during his US tour on September and October, starting in Boston's Newbury Comics and ending at Houston's Cactus Music. On 10 November, Turner went on an extensive worldwide tour to promote the record along with his first box set The First Ten Years, beginning with Falmouth, Cornwall's Princess Pavilion and ending on Miami's Salty Dog Cruise.

Critical reception

Positive Songs for Negative People received favourable reviews but music critics were divided over Turner's vocal delivery and lyricism. At Metacritic, which assigns a normalized rating out of 100 to reviews from mainstream critics, the album received an average score of 69, based on 20 reviews.

Mark Beaumont of NME praised the sentiments spread throughout the record and the variety of emotions the songs bring out. Eric Swedlund of The A.V. Club found the album better than Tape Deck Heart, praising the upbeat demeanor that goes along with Turner's songwriting, saying that "[T]he result pushes Turner and his band back into more energetic territory after the careful, pristine sound of his previous effort." Thom Jurek of AllMusic praised the record's eclectic musicianship combined with uplifting and introspective lyrics, calling it "an invigorating, infectious set that reaffirms Turner's faith in music's power to motivate and heal."

Alexis Petridis of The Guardian found some of the material weary with its earnestness and rousing bombast, but said that they were outweighed with more melancholic tracks like "Silent Key" and "Song for Josh", concluding that, "For all its flaws, Positive Songs for Negative People feels like the work of someone who knows exactly what he’s doing." Ryan Reed of Paste noted that the songs throughout were marred by a mixture of embarrassing lyrics with soaring choruses, concluding that "Turner leaves behind considerable wreckage with Positive Songs—in ways both cathartic and clumsy. And as usual, he goes down swinging."

Stuart Knapman of DIY found the album's various themes lacking in terms of insight and character that worked well in previous efforts, saying that "Positive Songs… simply fails to live up to the high standards Turner has previously set." Benjamin Bland of Drowned in Sound criticised the record for being a re-hash of previous material that replaces the charm and witty lyricism with off-putting delivery and generic lyrics that are "almost self-parody level at times." Bland said that, "This is Turner’s most staid and uninvolving work to date, suggesting that some of the filler that clogged up 2013's decent enough Tape Deck Heart was a sign of things to come."

Commercial performance
The album debuted at number 2 in the UK behind Dr. Dre's Compton during the week of 14 August 2015. On the Billboard 200, it debuted and peaked at number 69 the week of 29 August 2015, before leaving the chart completely. It additionally charted within the top 40 of several additional territories, surpassing what Tape Deck Heart achieved previously. The record debuted at number 7 in Germany before dropping to number 34 the next week and leaving the chart. It debuted at numbers 11 and 21 in Switzerland and Austria respectively (whereas his previous album charted at numbers 79 and 34 respectively).

Track listing

Personnel
Adapted credits from the liner notes of Positive Songs for Negative People.

Frank Turner & the Sleeping Souls
Frank Turner – lead vocals, acoustic guitar, electric guitar
Ben Lloyd – electric guitar, backing vocals
Tarrant Anderson – bass guitar, backing vocals
Matt Nasir – piano, organ, synthesizer, mandolin, mandola, acoustic guitar, backing vocals
Nigel Powell – drums and percussion, backing vocals

Additional musicians
Jeff Kievit – trumpet 
David Peel – horn 
Mike Davis – trombone 
Andy Snitzer – tenor sax 
Cahir O'Doherty – scream 
Esmé Patterson – vocals 
Todd Stopera – backing vocals
Butch Walker – backing vocals
Lindi Ortega – backing vocals
Jaclyn Monroe – backing vocals
Kat Jones – backing vocals
Billy the Kid – backing vocals

Recording personnel
Butch Walker – producer
Todd Stopera – engineer
Chris Clark – additional engineering 
Graham Kay – additional engineering 
Ben Lloyd – additional engineering 
Claudius Mittendorfer – mixing
Frank Arkwright – mastering
Artwork
Go de Jong – art direction and design
Nicole Kibert – live photo
Jamie-James Medina – studio photography

Charts

Certifications

References

2015 albums
Frank Turner albums
Xtra Mile Recordings albums